Adam Davidson (born 1970) is an American journalist. He was a co-founder of NPR's Planet Money program. Previously he has covered globalization issues, the Asian tsunami, and the war in Iraq, for which he won the Daniel Schorr Journalism Prize. He and Adam McKay were former co-hosts of Surprisingly Awesome from Gimlet Media.  Davidson worked as an economics columnist for The New York Times Magazine and in 2016 took a position at The New Yorker.

Early life and education 
Davidson's father, Jack Davidson, was a film and television actor, and he grew up in the Westbeth Artists Community in Manhattan's West Village. He attended college at the University of Chicago, graduating in 1992. Adam is an atheist of Jewish descent.

Career 
Davidson worked at PRI as a Middle East correspondent for Marketplace and then went on to work at NPR as the international business and economics correspondent.
In 2008, Davidson, along with Alex Blumberg founded Planet Money on NPR. 

He went on to write for the New York Times Magazine as an economics columnist. In 2016, he joined The New Yorker as a staff writer. By 2021, he had left that position, but remained a contributing writer to the magazine. About a NewsGuild unionization drive which was promising to protect New Yorker writers from firings and unwanted editorial input, Davidson summed up the writers' consensus opinion, saying “None of us want to do anything that could jeopardize the magazine we love. We don’t want so strong a union that mediocrity reigns and it’s impossible to get rid of poor performers. We actually kind of like the feeling that we need to continue to earn our place."

Awards 
Davidson won the George Polk Award in Radio Reporting for his reporting with Alex Blumberg for a May 2008 show titled "The Giant Pool of Money". The piece explained the highly complex chain of events that led to the subprime mortgage crisis by showcasing interviews with participants at each sector of the crisis. The episode was linked widely in the blogosphere and remains one of the show's most-downloaded podcasts.

Bibliography

References

External links
 
 Adam Davidson at The New Yorker

American male journalists
NPR personalities
Living people
American podcasters
The New Yorker staff writers
1970 births
20th-century American journalists
21st-century American journalists
20th-century American male writers
21st-century American male writers
University of Chicago alumni